lsmod is a command on Linux systems. It shows which loadable kernel modules are currently loaded.

An example terminal print after running lsmod command: 
 Module                  Size  Used by
 af_packet              27392  2 
 8139too                30592  0 
 snd_cs46xx             96872  3 
 snd_pcm_oss            55808  1 
 snd_mixer_oss          21760  2 snd_pcm_oss
 ip6table_filter         7424  1 
 ip6_tables             19728  1 ip6table_filter
 ipv6                  290404  22 
 xfs                   568384  4 
 sis900                 18052  5 
 libata                169920  1 pata_sis
 scsi_mod              158316  3 usb_storage,sd_mod,libata
 usbcore               155312  6 ohci_hcd, usb_storage, usbhid

"Module" denotes the name of the module. "Size" denotes the size of the module (not memory used) in Bytes. "Used by" shows that number of times the module is currently in use by running programs. Next to this is a list of other modules which refer to this one. The "Used by" list is sometimes incomplete. If the module controls its own unloading via a can_unload routine then the use count displayed by lsmod is always -1, irrespective of the real use count.

See also 
 modprobe

References 

Linux kernel-related software